KLMV-LD, virtual and UHF digital channel 15, is a low-power Spanish-language religious television station that serves Laredo, Texas and Nuevo Laredo, Tamaulipas, Mexico. The station is owned by J. B. Salazar.

History

KLMV started broadcasting on December 10, 1999 as K68FU on analog channel 68 and was Buena Vida Broadcasting's flagship station. It aired independent Spanish Christian programming across South Texas. From 1999 to 2000, channel 68 was affiliated with Vida Communications, and then HSN. From 2003 through 2006, the station was affiliated with Almavision. In September 2006, KLMV went independent. KLMV was Buena Vida Broadcasting's flagship station. The network, KLMV, and the repeaters are owned and operated by J. B. Salazar. In July 2012, KLMV started broadcasting on subchannel 15.3 a local general programming channel called Televida Laredo. In February 2011, KLMV switched to digital channel 15. In late December 2012, KLMV announced that it would start broadcasting TeLe-Romantica programming on subchannel 15.2 in the first quarter of 2013. In February 2013, TeLe-Romantica programming could be seen on channel 15.2 and Vida Vision TV on 15.4. In March 2013, KLMV replaced TeLe-Romántica programming with infomercials and switched Televida Laredo on 15.4 and Vida Vision on 15.3. In early 2014, KLMV dropped Televida Laredo programming and replaced it with color bars. In September 2020, KLMV dropped all religious programming and affiliated to MeTV on its main channel, Estrella TV on 15.2, Movies! on channel 15.3 and Jewelry TV on channel 15.4. As of November 2022, KLMV is once again displaying color bars on all four channels. In December 2022, KLMV started broadcasting La Fregona TV on subchannel 15.2 and Voz y Vision TV on channel 15.3.

Subchannels

The station's digital signal is multiplexed:

References

External links

LMV-LD
Television channels and stations established in 1998
Low-power television stations in the United States
Religious television stations in the United States
Movies! affiliates